Brooksby railway station was a former station serving the villages of Brooksby, Hoby and Rotherby in Leicestershire. The station was situated at a level crossing on the Brooksby to Hoby road.

History
The station opened in 1846 on the Syston and Peterborough Railway. The station buildings were larger than most on the line, considering it served a small village. The stationmasters' house was designed by the architects William Parsons and Sancton Wood. The contractors T.W.& H. Herbert undertook to build it for £1,921.

It closed in 1961. It remained in use for goods until 1964. The station became grade II listed building in 1979.

Stationmasters

Benjamin Isett ca. 1851
Thomas Howitt ca. 1861 - 1863
Joseph Clemenstone 1863 - ca. 1865
John Ballentine ca. 1871 - 1879
Lot Gilby 1879 - 1883
John Jameson 1883 - 1900
Henry E. Haines 1900 - 1903 (formerly station master at Watnall, afterwards station master at Helpston)
Samson Seddon 1903 - 1926 (formerly station master at Syston)
J.H. Roberts ca. 1928 (also station master at Rearsby)
Luke Randolph Benson ca. 1933 - 1942 (also station master at Rearsby)
T.A. Goddard 1942 - 1944 (afterwards station master at Leigh)
T.T. Perkins 1944
G.W.S. Springs 1944 - ca. 1945
L. Cope ca. 1957

References

Former Midland Railway stations
Disused railway stations in Leicestershire
Railway stations in Great Britain opened in 1846
Railway stations in Great Britain closed in 1961
Grade II listed railway stations
Grade II listed buildings in Leicestershire
1846 establishments in England